HMS Conquestador was a 74-gun third rate ship of the line of the Royal Navy, launched on 1 August 1810 at Northam.

She was cut down to a 50-gun ship in 1827, and hulked in 1860. Conquestador was sold out of the Navy in 1897.

References

Ships of the line of the Royal Navy
Vengeur-class ships of the line
Ships built in Devon
1810 ships